Demography of the Philippines records the human population, including its population density, ethnicity, education level, health, economic status, religious affiliations, and other aspects. The Philippines annualized population growth rate between the years 2015–2020 was 1.63%. According to the 2020 census, the population of the Philippines is 109,035,343. The first census in the Philippines was held in the year 1591 which counted 667,612 people.

The majority of Filipinos are lowland Austronesians, while the Aetas (Negritos), as well as other highland groups form a minority. The indigenous population is related to the indigenous populations of the Malay Archipelago. Some ethnic groups that have been in the Philippines for centuries before Spanish and American colonial rule have assimilated or intermixed. 600,000 people from the United States live in the Philippines. They represent 0.56% of the total population. The ethnic groups include Arabs, Japanese, Han Chinese and Indians which form parts of the population.

The most commonly spoken indigenous languages are Tagalog and Cebuano, with 23.8 million (45 million speakers as Filipino) and 16 million speakers, respectively. Nine other indigenous languages have at least one million native speakers: Ilocano, Hiligaynon, Waray, Bicolano, Kapampangan, Pangasinan, Maranao, Maguindanao, and Tausug. One or more of these are spoken as a mother tongue by more than 93% of the population. Filipino and English are the official languages but there are between 120 and 170 distinct indigenous Philippine languages (depending on expert classifications).

Population history

The first census in the Philippines was in 1591, based on tributes collected. The tributes counted the total founding population of the Spanish-Philippines as 667,612 people. 20,000 were Chinese migrant traders, at different times: around 15,600 individuals were Latino soldier-colonists who were cumulatively sent from Peru and Mexico and they were shipped to the Philippines annually, 3,000 were Japanese residents, and 600 were pure Spaniards from Europe. There was a large but unknown number of South Asian Filipinos, as the majority of the slaves imported into the archipelago were from Bengal and Southern India, adding Dravidian speaking South Indians and Indo-European speaking Bengalis into the ethnic mix. 

The rest were Malays and Negritos. With 667,612 people, during this era, the Philippines was among the most sparsely populated lands in Asia. In contrast, Japan during that era (the 1500s) had a population of 8 Million or Mexico had a population of 4 million, which was huge compared to the Philippine's 600,000. In 1600, the method of population counting was revamped by the Spanish officials, who then based the counting of the population through church records.

In 1798, the population of Luzon or Luconia was estimated to be around 600,000 with the other islands, unknown. 200,000 of the 600,000 population were of mixed-raced descent of either Spanish, Chinese or Latin-American admixture. 5,000 enlisted soldiers on that year, were of South American descent, while 2,500 were pure Spanish officers. There were 20,000 new Chinese immigrants. The book, "Intercolonial Intimacies Relinking Latin/o America to the Philippines, 1898–1964 By Paula C. Park" citing "Forzados y reclutas: los criollos novohispanos en Asia (1756-1808)" gave a higher number of later Mexican soldier-immigrants to the Philippines, pegging the number at 35,000 immigrants in the 1700s. 

In 1799, Friar Manuel Buzeta estimated the population of all the Philippine islands as 1,502,574. Despite the number of Mixed Spanish-Filipino descent being the lowest, they may be more common than expected as many Spaniards often had Filipino concubines and mistresses and they frequently produced children out of wedlock. The first official census was in 1878, when the population as of midnight on December 31, 1877, was counted. This was followed by the 1887 census, with the 1898 census not completed. The 1887 census yielded a count of 5,984,727 excluding non-Christians.

In the 1860s to 1890s, in the urban areas of the Philippines, especially at Manila, according to burial statistics, as much as 3.3% of the population were pure European Spaniards and the pure Chinese were as high as 9.9%. The Spanish-Filipino and Chinese-Filipino mestizo populations may have fluctuated. Eventually, everybody belonging to these non-native categories diminished because they were assimilated into and chose to self-identify as pure Filipinos. Since during the Philippine Revolution, the term "Filipino" included anybody born in the Philippines coming from any race. That would explain the abrupt drop of otherwise high Chinese, Spanish and mestizo percentages across the country by the time of the first American census in 1903.

1903 census
In 1903 the population of the Philippines was recounted by American authorities to fulfill Act 467. The survey yielded 7,635,426 people, including 56,138 who were foreign-born.

1920 census
According to the 1920 United States Census, there were 10,314,310 people in the Philippines. 99 percent were Filipino; 51,751 were either Chinese or Japanese; 34,563 were of mixed race; 12,577 were Caucasian; and 7,523 were African.

1939
The 1939 census was undertaken in conformity with Section 1 of Commonwealth Act 170. The Philippine population figure was 16,000,303.

1941
In 1941 the estimated population of the Philippines reached 17,000,000. Manila's population was 684,000.

By then, some 27% of the population could speak English as a second language, while the number of Spanish speakers as first language had further fallen to 3% from 10 to 14% at the beginning of the century. In 1936, Tagalog was selected to be the basis for a national language. In 1987, the Filipino language, a standard language based on Tagalog, was imposed as the national language and as one of the two official languages alongside English.

Philippine census surveys

In 1960, the government of the Philippines conducted a survey on both population, and housing. The population was pegged at 27,087,685. Successive surveys were again conducted in 1970, 1975, 1980, and 1990, which gave the population as 36,684,948, 42,070,660, 48,098,460, and 60,703,206 respectively. In 1995, the POPCEN was launched, undertaken at the month of September, The data provided the bases for the Internal Revenue Allocation to local government units, and for the creation of new legislative areas. The count was made official by then President Fidel Ramos by Proclamation No, 849 on August 14, 1995, The population was 68,616,536.

Vital statistics

UN estimates

Fertility and births

Total fertility rate (TFR) (wanted fertility rate) and crude birth rate (CBR):

Single mother phenomenon and illegitimate birth rate 

More than half of the children born every year in the Philippines are illegitimate, and the percentage of illegitimate children is rising by 2% per year. First time single mothers normally consist of girls in the 17 to 19 years old age bracket. Some females become prostitutes in the Philippines after they become unwed single mothers from teenage pregnancy. More than half of women do not want anymore children but the access to contraceptive methods have declined, and especially in case of Philippines the people are hesitant to use modern scientific contraceptives due to opposition by the Catholic Church. The reasons for the high illegitimate birthrate and single motherhood include the unpopularity of artificial contraception in the Philippines inadequate sex education, delays in implementing birth control legislation and a machismo attitude among many Filipino males. There are three million household heads without a spouse, two million of whom were female (2015 PSA estimates).

Between 2010 and 2014, 54% of all pregnancies in the Philippines (1.9 million pregnancies) were unintended. Consequently, 9% of women between 15 and 19 years of age have begun childbearing, and every year there are 610 000 unsafe abortions. In 2017, modern contraceptive prevalence rate (CPR) in "the Philippines was 40% among married women of reproductive age and 17% among unmarried sexually active women" and "Forty-six percent of married women used no contraceptive method in 2017 and 14% a traditional method." The "unmet need for family planning' which is the lack of access of contraceptives to women do not want to have more children or wish to delay having children was 17% among married women and 49% among unmarried and among unmarried only 22% women were able to access modern contraceptive methods. "As a consequence of the low contraceptive met need, 68% of unintended pregnancies occur in women not using any method and 24% in those using traditional methods" and the rest had to resort to unsafe traditional methods.

The Catholic Church in Philippines opposes sex before or outside marriage, and the use of modern contraceptive and the passing of laws allowing for divorce. It continues to mix religion with politics since the time of Spanish friar, while Catholic priests continue to have scandals by having affairs and by fathering offsprings with women amidst of allegation of child sexual abuse by the Catholic Church clergy. The Catholic religion that was introduced by Spanish colonial era Catholic friars was adapted through a process of enculturation. Hence, there is a gap between the [relatively more orthodox] scriptural Catholic religion and the version practiced by Filipinos in daily life. 84% Filipinos are Catholic, and what Filipinos actually do in practice is different from what they believe in, i.e. Filipinos practice a liberal cultural attitude towards sexual relationships while also contrastingly practicing orthodox Catholic religious belief which opposes the modern scientific contraceptives and laws based on the modern values, resulting in lack of access to family planning methods, stigmatization of medical abortions, a high number of unwanted pregnancies, lack of access to safe modern medical abortions, high and still rising trend of illegitimate newborn birth rate.

The law of the Philippines continues to differentiate and discriminate between filiation (recognition of the biological relationship between father and child) and legitimacy (legally considered a legitimate child), national law still continues to label the "nonmarital births" as "illegitimate", which has been criticized by the social and legal activists for the constitutional stigmatization and denial of equal legal rights.

The following table, based on the annual official data sourced from Philippine Statistics Authority, shows the growing annual trend of illegitimate child births by percentages:

Life expectancy

Source: UN World Population Prospects

Year by year
Source: Philippine Statistics Authority

Current vital statistics

 - not full data, estimation at the end of September in 2021 and 2022

Structure of the population

By region
Total fertility rate (TFR) and other related statistics by region, as of 2013:

Ethnic groups and modern immigrants in the Philippines

The majority of the people in the Philippines are related to Malay people, or more broadly the Austronesian peoples. The largest of these groups are the Visayans, Tagalogs, Ilocanos, Bicolanos, Moros, Kapampangans, Pangasinenses, and the Zamboangueños. The indigenous peoples of the Philippines form a minority of the population. Other large ethnic groups include Filipinos of Japanese, Indian, Chinese, Spanish, and American descent. There are more than 175 ethnolinguistic groups in the Philippines, each with their own, identity, literature, tradition, music, dances, foods, beliefs, and history, but which form part of the tapestry of Filipino culture. The latest censuses did not take account of ethnicity, and the only census that included questions on ethnicity is of the 2000 census. Nevertheless, a 2019 Anthropology Study by Matthew Go, published in the Journal of Human Biology, using physical anthropology, estimated that, 72.7% of Filipinos are Asian, 12.7% of Filipinos can be classified as Hispanic (Latin-American Mestizos or Malay-Spanish Mestizos), 7.3% as Indigenous American, African at 4.5% and European at 2.7%.

The total number of immigrants and expats in Philippines as of the 2010 censuses is 177,365. By country:

United States of America	29,972
China	28,705
Japan	11,584
India	9,007
Korea, South	5,822
Korea, North	4,846
Canada	4,700
United Kingdom of Great Britain And Northern Ireland 3,474
Australia	3,360
Germany	3,184
Indonesia	2,781
Taiwan 	1,538
Italy	1,460
Afghanistan	1,019
France	1,014
Spain	1,009
Switzerland	872
Turkey	739
Singapore	691
South Africa	681
Malaysia	673
Saudi Arabia	621
Norway	550
Israel	514
Sweden	513
Iran	498
Tunisia	479
Belgium	445
Congo	444
Austria	424
Pakistan	421
Netherlands	407
Algeria	389
Ecuador	387
Denmark	374
United Arab Emirates	368
Ireland	362
Myanmar	355
Vietnam	351
Oman	342
New Zealand	325
Thailand	286
Hungary	206
Nigeria	162
Jordan	150
Sri Lanka	146
Kuwait	144
Egypt	135
Brazil	134
Bangladesh	133
Greece	129
Argentina	125
Mexico	123
East Timor	119
Armenia	115
Lebanon	110
Cape Verde	109
Colombia	106
Suriname	106
Qatar	102
Others	1,617

Languages

According to the Komisyon ng Wikang Filipino, there are 135 ethnic languages in the Philippine archipelago, each spoken by the respective ethno-linguistic group, except for the national Filipino language which is spoken by all 134 ethno-linguistic groups in the country. Most of the languages have several varieties (dialects), totaling over 300 across the archipelago. In the 1930s, the government promoted the use of the Tagalog language as the national language, and called the new Tagalog-based language as the national Filipino language, becoming the 135th ethnic language of the country. Visayan languages (Cebuano, Waray, Hiligaynon, etc.) are widely spoken throughout the Visayas and in most parts of Mindanao. Ilokano is the lingua franca of Northern Luzon excluding Pangasinan. Zamboangueño Chavacano is the official language of Zamboanga City and lingua franca of Basilan.

Filipino and English are the official languages of the country for purposes of communication and instruction. Consequently, English is widely spoken and understood, although fluency has decreased as the prevalence of Tagalog in primary and secondary educational institutions has increased.

Religion

The Philippine Statistics Authority in October 2015 reported that % of the total Filipino population were Roman Catholics, 10.8% were Protestant and % were Islamic. Although the 2012 International Religious Freedom (IRF) reports that an estimate by the National Commission on Muslim Filipinos (NCMF) in 2011 stated that there were then 10.3 million Muslims, or about 10 percent of the total population however this is yet to be proven officially. In 2000, according to the "World Values Survey", 1.8% were Protestant Christians and 10.9% were then irreligious. Other Christian denominations include the Iglesia ni Cristo (one of a number of separate Churches of Christ generally not affiliated with one another), Aglipayan Church, Members Church of God International, and the Church of Jesus Christ of Latter-day Saints (LDS Church). Minority religions include Buddhism, Hinduism, and Judaism.
Roman Catholics and Protestants were converted during the four centuries of Western influence by Spain, and the United States. Under Spanish rule, much of the population was converted to Christianity.

Orthodox Christianity also has a presence in the Philippines. The Orthodoxy was brought over by Russian and Greek immigrants to the Philippines. Protestant Christianity arrived in the Philippines during the 20th century, introduced by American missionaries.

Other religions include Judaism, Mahayana Buddhism, often mixed with Taoist beliefs, Hinduism, Sikhism, and Indigenous Philippine folk religions.

Education

Education in the Philippines has been influenced by foreign models, particularly the United States, and Spain. Philippine students enter public school at about age four, starting from nursery school up to kindergarten. At about seven years of age, students enter elementary school (6 to 7 years). This is followed by junior high school (4 years) and senior high school (2 years). Students then take the college entrance examinations (CEE), after which they enter university (3 to 5 years). Other types of schools include private school, preparatory school, international school, laboratory high school, and science high school. School year in the Philippines starts from June, and ends in March with a two-month summer break from April to May, one week of semestral break in October, and a week or two during Christmas and New Year holidays.

Starting in SY 2011–2012 there has been a phased implementation of a new program. The K to 12 Program covers kindergarten and 12 years of basic education (six years of primary education, four years of junior high school, and two years of senior high school [SHS]).

Publications

 1903 Census of the Philippine Islands, Volumes 1, 2, 3, 4

References

External links

  
 
 
 

 
Philippines